Gihtsejiegņa or Gihtsejiegŋa is one of the largest glaciers in mainland Norway. The name of the glacier comes from the Lule Sami language.

See also
List of glaciers in Norway

References

Narvik
Glaciers of Nordland